Cathedral of Our Lady of the Assumption or other variations on the name, may refer to:

Angola 
 Our Lady of the Assumption Cathedral, Saurimo

Brazil 
 Cathedral Basilica of Our Lady of Assumption, Mariana

China 
 Our Lady of the Assumption Cathedral, Ningbo

Canada 
 Our Lady of the Assumption Cathedral, Moncton, New Brunswick

-Our Lady Of The Assumption Cathedral, Gravelbourg, Saskatchewan.

Colombia 
 Cathedral Basilica of Our Lady of the Assumption, Popayán

Congo, Democratic Republic of the 
 Our Lady of the Assumption Cathedral, Boma

Cuba 
 Cathedral Basilica of Our Lady of the Assumption, Santiago de Cuba

France 
 Cathedral of Our Lady of the Assumption, Mata-Utu

Gambia 
 Our Lady of the Assumption Cathedral, Banjul

Haiti 
 Our Lady of the Assumption Cathedral, Cap-Haïtien
 Cathedral of Our Lady of the Assumption, Port-au-Prince

Hungary 
 Our Lady of the Assumption Cathedral, Kaposvár

Mexico 
 Cathedral Basilica of Our Lady of the Assumption, Aguascalientes
 Guadalajara Cathedral
 Cathedral of Our Lady of the Assumption, Oaxaca
 Our Lady of the Assumption Cathedral, Tlaxcala

Nicaragua 
 Our Lady of the Assumption Cathedral, Granada
 Our Lady of the Assumption Cathedral, Juigalpa
 León Cathedral, Nicaragua

Papua New Guinea 
 Our Lady of the Assumption Cathedral, Buka

Paraguay 
 Metropolitan Cathedral of Our Lady of the Assumption, Asunción

Portugal 
 Our Lady of the Assumption Cathedral, Elvas
 Our Lady of the Assumption Cathedral, Lamego
 Our Lady of the Assumption Cathedral, Santarém

Spain 
 Cathedral of Our Lady of the Assumption, Córdoba

Swaziland 
 Our Lady of Assumption Cathedral, Manzini

Syria 
 Cathedral of Our Lady of the Assumption, Aleppo

Venezuela 
 Our Lady of the Assumption Cathedral, Maracay, Roman Catholic
 Cathedral of Our Lady of the Assumption in Maracay (Syriac Catholic)

See also
 Cathedral of the Assumption (disambiguation)
 Our Lady of the Assumption Church (disambiguation)
 Pro-Cathedral of Our Lady of the Assumption (Brunei)